Merritt Island High School is a public high school located in Merritt Island, Florida. It was built in 1965.

Principals

Robert Bruton: 1965 - 1983
Hank Smith: 1983 - 1999
David M. Piccolo: 2000 - 2002
Gary Shiffrin: 2002 - 2013
Dr. Karyle Green: 2013 - 2014
Mollie Vega: 2014 - 2018
James Rehmer: 2018–present

Academics 

Merritt Island High School is accredited. The school offers classes for grades 9-12, including Honors courses, Advanced Placement courses, and courses with the Dual Enrollment program at Eastern Florida State College.

To graduate, students must earn a minimum of 26 credits. Each semester-course is equal to a half credit.
There is also a variety of academies available for students to enroll in. Including the Advance Placement academy, Fame academy for the performing arts, and Davinci.

Athletics

Teams

 Wrestling
 Basketball
 Bowling
 Cheerleading
 Cross country 
 Dance Team
 Football
 Golf
 Lacrosse
 Soccer
 Softball
 Swim and Diving
 Tennis
 Track
 Indoor Volleyball
Beach Volleyball
Baseball

State championships 

 Boys Soccer 4A championship - 2009. 3A championship - 2014.
 Girls Soccer 4A championship - 2010. 3A championship - 2017 and 2018.
 American football 4A championship - 1972, 1978 & 1979.
 Baseball 5A championship - 1999 & 2000.
 Volleyball 5A championship- 2011 & 2018
 Beach Volleyball AA championship - 2019

Clubs and extracurricular activities 
Extracurricular activities offered include:

 Academic Games team
 Art club
 Anime club
 Auto club
 Book club
 Beta Club
 Chess club
 Marine Science Club
 Chorus
 Concert and Chamber Orchestras
 DECA
 Drama/Theater
 Earth club
 Ethics club
 Fellowship of Christian Athletes
 FIRST Robotics Competition team
 Future Business Leaders of America
 Future Educators of America
 Future Problem Solvers
Gay Straight Alliance
 German club
 Guitar Club
 Inline hockey team
 Intramural athletics
 Jazz ensemble
 JROTC (including the Raider Team, Rifle Team, Drill Team, Color Guard and Command and Staff leadership positions)
 Key Club
 Literary magazine
 Magic club
 Marching, Concert and Symphonic Bands
 Marine Science Club
 Multicultural club
 Mustang Round-Up Leaders
 Straight Up G (vocal acapella group)
 National Art Honor Society
 National Honor Society
 Newspaper
 Quiz bowl team
 Rugby team
 Science Research
 SECME
 Spanish club
 Spanish National Honor Society
 Speech and debate club
 Student ministers
 Student council
 StangSat Club
 Student Government
 Student Venture
 Yearbook
 Video Game club
 DND (Dungeons and Dragons) club
 Welcoming diversity team
 Young Republicans Club
 Young Democrats Club

Notable alumni 

 Leon "Pop" Bright 1974 – professional football player
 Derek Brown 1988 – professional football player
 Cal Dixon 1987 – professional football player
 Tony Gayton 1977 – film producer
 Clint Hurdle 1975 – Professional baseball player and manager
 Mathew Martoma 1992 – former S.A.C. Capital Advisors trader, convicted of insider trading
 Will Perdue 1983 – professional basketball player and television sports announcer
 Kevin Whitaker 1975 – US ambassador to Colombia
 Jeff Wickersham – professional football player
 Steve Crisafulli - Former Speaker of the Florida House of Representatives https://stevecrisafulli.com/about/
 Richard Jones 1987 - State Wrestling Champion 105 lbs 1987, State Runner Up 98 lbs 1986 https://www.floridatoday.com/story/sports/high-school/2015/02/13/merritt-island-state-championship-history-strong/23373

See also 
 Brevard Public Schools

Footnotes

External links 
 
 Brevard Public Schools website
 Merritt Island Community Website
Football Team Scores and Info

High schools in Brevard County, Florida
Educational institutions established in 1965
Public high schools in Florida
Buildings and structures in Merritt Island, Florida
1965 establishments in Florida